Volumnia (according to Plutarch, her name was Vergilia) was the wife of Gaius Marcius Coriolanus in ancient Rome.

Coriolanus was exiled from Rome following a dispute with the tribunes of the plebs, and his family remained in Rome.  Coriolanus became a leader of the neighbouring Volsci and led them against Rome, besieging it.  Envoys from Rome failed to persuade Coriolanus to desist.  Then an embassy of Roman matrons, including Volumnia, their two sons, Coriolanus' mother Veturia, and other matrons, went to Coriolanus and convinced him to break off the siege.  Rome honoured the service of these women by the erection of a temple dedicated to Fortuna Muliebris (a female deity).

She appears as a character in Shakespeare's play, Coriolanus, named Virgilia.

References

External links
Volumnia Erôs in Ancient Greece, edited by Ed Sanders, Chiara Thumiger, Christopher Carey, Nick Lowe. Oxford University Press. 2013. Page 221. 
Volumnia Tapestry in the Baroque: New Aspects of Production and Patronage, edited by Thomas Patrick Campbell, Elizabeth A. H. Cleland. Metropolitan Museum of Art, New York. 2010. Page 52. 
Volumnia Daily Life of the Ancient Romans, by David Matz. Greenwood Press. 2002. Page 72. 
Volumnia A pictorial history of ancient Rome: with sketches of the history of modern Italy, by S. G. Goodrich. H Butler & Co. 1864. Page 42. 

5th-century BC Roman women
Volumnii